Desi Boyz is a 2011 Indian Hindi-language romantic comedy film directed by debutant Rohit Dhawan, son of director David Dhawan. The film stars Akshay Kumar, John Abraham, Deepika Padukone and Chitrangada Singh in lead roles while Sanjay Dutt features in an extended cameo.

The film was released on 25 November 2011, and received a mixed response from critics and was declared an average at the box office.

Plot
The story follows two friends and roommates, the Gujarati rebel Jignesh 'Jerry' Patel and clean simpleton Nikhil 'Nick' Mathur, who live in London. Jerry does odd jobs for a living as he is an undergraduate but Nick has a white-collar job. However, both find themselves jobless due to the economic downturn. Jerry has a school-age nephew named Veer whom he looks after, as the child has lost his parents. Nick intends to marry his girlfriend, Radhika Awasthi, who dreams of a lovely wedding, a great honeymoon and a wonderful house to live in after marriage.

Out of a job, Jerry finds it difficult to even pay Veer's school fees because of which the government is on the verge of giving Veer's custody to a foster family. Nick fears he won't be able to fulfill the dreams of his to-be wife. It is to tide over the difficult times that Jerry and Nick turn to the oddest profession in the world as they become escorts for a company owned by one Mr. Khalnayak, fulfilling the fantasies of girls and ladies. Nonetheless, once their covers are blown, the ill-fated happens: Jerry is unable to prevent Veer from being sent to a foster home, and Nick loses Radhika when she learns of what he has been up to while she is away in India. Frustrated, Nick blames Jerry for forcing him into the profession and asks him to move out of his house and life.

Nick now tries to win Radhika back and help comes from the most unlikely source – Radhika's father Suresh, who has come to London with her. Meanwhile, on the advice of Vikrant Mehra, a social service worker in charge of Veer's adoption, Jerry registers in college again to complete his graduation so that he can earn enough money to get Veer's legal custody. While in college, Jerry demands an explanation from his economics professor for ousting him without reason, when he realizes that she is none other than his former classmate Tanya Sharma, who is now a professor at the same college. Sparks fly between the two. Meanwhile, to make Nick jealous, Radhika dates a man named Ajay. Nick starts to pick on Ajay, often calling him Vijay intentionally. After some reconsideration, Radhika forgives Nick, but he instead rejects her after she disapproves of Jerry. Meanwhile, Jerry graduates from college and also wins Tanya's heart. Nick arrives with Jerry's mother and apologizes to him. All is forgiven when Nick and Jerry reconcile. Jerry then helps Radhika win back Nick.

Nick then helps Jerry get a high paying job, and Jerry decides to go to court and get back Veer's custody. Ajay turns out to be the lawyer against Jerry's side. He decides to get revenge on Nick by not letting Jerry win his case. Ajay tells the court about Jerry being a male escort and what a bad role model he would be to Veer, bringing in 3 witnesses to testify against Jerry. He asks each of them if they had paid Jerry for sex, but only one says yes. Ajay is on the verge of winning, but Mr. Khalnayak comes into the courtroom and influences the judge. Jerry then makes an inspiring speech to the judge. He ends up winning the case and gaining full custody of Veer. The economy improves and everyone is happy in the end; in a short ending scene, a newspaper article is shown stating that the recession will strike back, when Mr. Khalnayak gives a call and says that he has obtained the license for a branch in Mumbai.

Cast
 Akshay Kumar as Jignesh 'Jerry' Patel a.k.a. Rocco
 John Abraham as Nikhil 'Nick' Mathur a.k.a. Hunter
 Deepika Padukone as Radhika "Rads" Awasthi
 Chitrangada Singh as Tanya Sharma
 Virej Dasani as Veer Patel, Jerry's adopted son
 Anupam Kher as Suresh Awasthi, Radhika's father
 Sanjay Dutt as Mr. Khalnayak 
 Omi Vaidya as Ajay Bapat
 Mohnish Bahl as Vikrant Mehra, A Social Worker
 Shraman Jain as Rohan, Jerry's Friend
 Bharati Achrekar as Jerry's mother
 Satish Kaushik as Mr. Dhillon
 Ashwin Mushran as Defence Lawyer
 Bruna Abdullah as Natasha Mehra in a Special Appearance in song "Subha Hone Na De"
 Larissa Bonesi in a Special Appearance in song "Subha Hone Na De"

Inspiration
Desi Boyz was reported to be inspired by the aftermath of thousands of Indian students being duped by various universities in the West such as Tri Valley University, Herguan University, London Metropolitan University and University of Navarra.

Plagiarism
The basic plot and even some of the scenes of the movie have been lifted from various Adam Sandler movies like Reign Over Me, Billy Madison and Big Daddy.

Production

In Sudhir Mishra's movie Yeh Saali Zindagi (2011), Singh played the role of an aspiring singer from Delhi who goes to Mumbai to get fame and money.
Desi Boyz started filming on 7 November 2010, and completed shooting in May 2011. The film was to feature Sonam Kapoor as the lead actress, but she declined the film. There were also rumours of the film being offered to Anushka Sharma, but she denied this. Eventually, Deepika Padukone and Chitrangada Singh were finalised as the female leads. This marks the collaboration of Kumar and Abraham after Garam Masala. Padukone was seen opposite John Abraham for the first time and Singh starred opposite Akshay Kumar in her first commercial venture.

After short on extras for a scene at Oxford University, the film used website StarNow.com to recruit extras for filming. The first theatrical trailer was released on 23 September 2011, alongside Mausam, whilst the second trailer was released alongside Ra.One on 26 October 2011.

Release
Desi Boyz got an A (adults only) certificate from Central Board of Film Certification, although the makers were expecting a U/A certificate. The movie released in the United States on 23 November 2011 for the Thanksgiving Holiday weekend and released in India two days later on 25 November 2011.

Reception
Taran Adarsh gave the film 2 stars, owing to the "tedious and least compelling second hour". However, he praised the chemistry of the lead actors, commenting that "the camaraderie between Akshay and John is piping hot". Raja Sen of Rediff.com gave 1.5 stars calling it a disaster. Aniruddha Guha gave the film 2 stars, and called it "more than tolerable", despite recalling that "the film did make [him] laugh out loud about twice." Subhash K. Jha gave the film 3.5 out of 5 Stars calling "highly entertaining sex comedy movie having Smart, sassy, sexy and sparkling with dark audacious humour". The film mainly received positive reviews from the Times of India gave a verdict of "Good". Indiaglitz gave it 4 stars. Glamsham gave it 3 stars. Sify gave it 3 stars as well. Komal Nahta also gave it  stars.

Box office
Desi Boyz had an above average opening of Rs 275 million domestically in its opening weekend. It showed a 20% increase on Saturday, bringing the two-day total to Rs. 180 million net. The film grossed approximately INR 280 million by the end of the weekend and INR 380 million net by the end of its first week. It raked in INR 342.5 million in its second week taking the total to INR 460 million, it collected a total of INR 540 million in India and INR 770 million worldwide. Desi Boyz was overall declared "Average". Its box office collections were much lower than expected because it surprisingly got an 'A' certificate from Central Board of Film Certification.

Soundtrack

The film's songs were composed by Pritam Chakraborty and the lyrics were penned by Irshad Kamil, Kumaar & Amitabh Bhattacharya. Bohemia raps to set the scene for Sanjay Dutt's cameo as he walks in the courtroom.

The film score is composed by Sandeep Shirodkar.

Soundtrack reception 
The music album of Desi Boyz received positive reviews. Joginder Tuteja of Bollywood Hungama gave the album 4 stars, saying "Music of Desi Boyz exceeds expectations" and described the album as "one of the better 'masala' albums of the year." Furthermore, he chose Subha Hone Na De, Allah Maaf Kare, Make Some Noise For The Desi Boyz and Jhak Maar Ke as favorite picks.

Glamsham gave the music a rating of 4 out of 5 saying, "Pritam builds up a good tempo in Make Some Noise For The Desi Boyz and carries the fun promisingly with Jhak Maar Ke and Tu Mera Hero with an all-together new breed and genre of music."

The official video of Subha Hone Na De has reached over 130 million views on YouTube as of May 2020.

Sequel 
On 22 December 2022, Producers Anand Pandit and Parag Sanghvi announced the sequel titled Desi Boyz 2 with Eros International. The film is expected to go on floors in 2023.

References

External links
 
 
 
 
 

2011 films
2010s Hindi-language films
Films scored by Bohemia
Indian romantic musical films
2010s romantic musical films
Films featuring songs by Pritam
Indian romantic comedy films
2011 romantic comedy films
Films set in London
2011 directorial debut films